Žitavany is a village and municipality in Zlaté Moravce District of the Nitra Region, in western-central Slovakia. The municipality had 1874 inhabitants in 2011.

References

External links
Official homepage
Information on e-obce.sk

Villages and municipalities in Zlaté Moravce District